Deuterated etifoxine (developmental code name GRX-917) is a drug which is under development for the treatment of anxiety disorders and mood disorders. It was originated by GABA Therapeutics and is under development by GABA Therapeutics and ATAI Life Sciences. Deuterated etifoxine is a deuterated form of etifoxine (Stresam) with improved pharmacokinetic properties, for instance a longer elimination half-life and duration of action. Etifoxine has been widely used as an anxiolytic for many decades. Etifoxine and deuterated etifoxine are GABAA receptor positive allosteric modulators (GABAkines) and ligands of the translocator protein (TSPO), both of which may contribute to anxiolytic effects. The TSPO promotes steroidogenesis of inhibitory neurosteroids such as allopregnanolone, which act as potent GABAA receptor positive allosteric modulators, and hence interactions with the TSPO can also indirectly potentiate the GABAA receptor. The precise chemical structure of deuterated etifoxine has not yet been disclosed. As of January 2023, deuterated etifoxine is in phase 1 clinical trials for anxiety disorders and preclinical development for mood disorders.

See also
 List of investigational anxiolytics

References

External links
 Etifoxine deuterated - AdisInsight
 GRX-917 - GABA Therapeutics

Anxiolytics
Benzoxazines
Chloroarenes
Deuterated compounds
Experimental drugs
GABAA receptor positive allosteric modulators
TSPO ligands